Valbrevenna is a comune (municipality) in the Metropolitan City of Genoa in the Italian region Liguria, located about  northeast of Genoa.

Valbrevenna borders the following municipalities: Carrega Ligure, Casella, Crocefieschi, Montoggio, Propata, Savignone, Torriglia, Vobbia.

Valbrevenna is known for its produce, most notably it's pinot noir grape which it exports around the country. It was the winner of the prestigious Vino Italia in 2018 and 2019, and was the front runner in the 2020 prize before the COVID-19 pandemic took over and closed the vineyard to the public. Other than grapes, the area is known for its rich soil which produces apples, peaches and cherries.

References

See also
 Parco naturale regionale dell'Antola

Cities and towns in Liguria
Geography of Liguria